"Lucky One" is a song by South Korean–Chinese boy band Exo, released on June 9, 2016, as the first single from their third studio album Ex'Act. It was released in both Korean and Chinese versions by their label SM Entertainment.

Background and release 
"Lucky One" was produced by LDN Noise and tells the story of a man finding true love. It was inspired off of pop, RnB, and disco music.

Music video 
The Korean and Chinese music videos for "Lucky One" were released on June 9, 2016. The music video tells the story of EXO members suddenly losing their superpowers and get captured by other planet. While the nurses try to experiment on them, their powers awaken and they try to escape.

Promotion 
EXO began performing "Lucky One" on South Korean music television programs on June 9, 2016.

Chart performance 
"Lucky One" peaked at number three on the Billboard World Digital Songs chart, number three on the Chinese Billboard Chart, and at five on the Gaon weekly digital chart.

Charts

Weekly charts

Monthly charts

Sales

References 

Exo songs
2016 songs
2016 singles
Korean-language songs
SM Entertainment singles